The Hoosier Hills Conference is a seven-member, IHSAA-sanctioned athletic conference comprising large 4A and 5A (football)-sized schools in Bartholomew, Clark, Floyd, Jackson, Jennings, and Lawrence in South Central and Southeast Indiana. Madison departed the conference in 2021, thereby reducing its size to seven member schools.

Membership 

 Played concurrently in HHC and EIAC 1972–73.

Former Members 

 Played concurrently in HHC and SIAC 1972–73.

Conference Championships

Football

Boys Basketball

Girls Basketball

Boys Soccer 

 Boy Soccer information from 1990–present.
 *indicates share of title

State Champions
IHSAA State Champions

Bedford North Lawrence Stars (8)
 1983 Girls Basketball
 1990 Boys Basketball
 1991 Girls Basketball
 2013 Girls Basketball (4A)
 2014 Girls Basketball (4A)
 2019 Unified Flag Football
 2022 Unified Track & Field
 2023 Girls Basketball (4A)

Columbus East Olympians (5)
 1979 Football (3A)
 1983 Girls Swimming
 1990 Girls Gymnastics
 2013 Football (4A)
 2017 Football (5A)

Floyd Central Highlanders (7)
 1989 Girls Cross Country
 1990 Girls Cross Country
 1991 Girls Cross Country
 1991 Boys Cross Country
 1992 Girls Cross Country
 2006 Boys Golf
 2007 Boys Golf

Jeffersonville Red Devils (4)
 1975 Girls Track
 1977 Girls Track
 1993 Boys Basketball
 2011 Girls Basketball (4A)

Madison Cubs (2)
 1950 Boys Basketball
 1999 Baseball (3A)

New Albany Bulldogs (5)
 1967 Boys Tennis
 1973 Boys Basketball
 1987 Softball
 1999 Girls Basketball (4A)
 2016 Boys Basketball (4A)

Seymour Owls (3)
 1988 Baseball
 1990 Girls Golf
 1991 Boys Golf

References

Indiana high school athletic conferences